Tsujihara (written: 辻原) is a Japanese surname. Notable people with the surname include:

Kevin Tsujihara (born 1964), American businessman
, Japanese novelist

Japanese-language surnames